Ab Murd-e Dam Ludab (also Romanized as Āb Mūrd-e Dam Lūdāb; also known as Ab Moord and Āb Mūrd) is a village in Ludab Rural District, Ludab District, Boyer-Ahmad County, Kohgiluyeh and Boyer-Ahmad Province, Iran. At the 2006 census, its population was 663, in 122 families.

References 

Populated places in Boyer-Ahmad County